Route 218 is a  local highway in northwestern New Brunswick, Canada. The eastern tip of the road is New Brunswick Route 130. The road is known as Main Street in Grand Falls, where it follows the eastern bank of the Saint John River.

Communities
 Hamlin, Maine
 Grand Falls, New Brunswick

See also
List of New Brunswick provincial highways

References

Grand Falls, New Brunswick
218
218